The University of Florida Board of Trustees is the governing body of the University of Florida, the Flagship University for the State University System of Florida. The University is located in Gainesville, Florida, United States. The current Chair of the Board is Mori Hosseini.

The Board of Trustees is the public body corporate of the university. It sets policy for the institution, and serves as the institution's legal owner and final authority. The UF Board of Trustees holds the institution's resources in trust and is responsible for their efficient and effective use. The UF Board of Trustees consists of six citizen members appointed by the Governor and five citizen members appointed by the Board of Governors. The Chair of the Faculty Senate and the President of the Student Body are also voting members.

Composition

References

External links 
 Board of Trustees
 Board of Governors expectations for Board of Trustees
 UF Board of Trustees Bylaws
 UF Board of Trustees Committees

University of Florida
Governing bodies of universities and colleges in the United States
2003 establishments in Florida